Torhamn, also called Torrum, is a locality situated in Karlskrona Municipality, Blekinge County, Sweden with 423 inhabitants in 2010.

The peninsula south of Torhamn is a popular site for birdwatching, particularly in spring and autumn. It was declared a nature reserve in 1977.

References 

Populated places in Karlskrona Municipality